Phania is a genus of plants in the tribe Eupatorieae within the family Asteraceae.

 Species

 formerly included
see Hofmeisteria Oxylobus 
 Phania arbutifolia (Kunth) DC. - Oxylobus arbutifolius (Kunth) A.Gray
 Phania dissecta Hook. & Arn. - Hofmeisteria dissecta (Hook. & Arn.) R.M.King & H.Rob.
 Phania urenifolia Hook. & Arn. - Hofmeisteria urenifolia (Hook. & Arn.) Walp.

References

Asteraceae genera
Eupatorieae